Srakane is the name of two islands on the Croatian coast:

Male Srakane
Vele Srakane